Willie Rough is a play by Scottish writer and director Bill Bryden, which is often regarded as a landmark of Scottish drama.

Originally a stage play produced by the Royal Lyceum Theatre Company in Edinburgh in 1972, a TV version was shown in 1976 as Play for Today, with a cast including Fulton Mackay and Roddy McMillan.

It is set in a Greenock shipyard around the outbreak of the First World War, and put forward a revolutionary socialist view of events of the time.  John Maclean, a Socialist leader who opposed the war, is mentioned several times but never appears in person.

References

External links 
 

1976 television plays
Play for Today
Anti-war films
Films about the labor movement
Films set in Scotland
Red Clydeside